Çaykənd (also, Chaykend) is a village in the Shaki Rayon of Azerbaijan.

References 

Populated places in Shaki District